Lust in the Dust is a 1985 Western comedy film starring Tab Hunter, Divine, Cesar Romero, and Lainie Kazan, and directed by Paul Bartel.

Plot
Dance-hall girl Rosie Velez, lost in the desert, is helped to safety by gunman Abel Wood. In the town of Chili Verde, at the saloon of Marguerita Ventura, word of a treasure in gold brings Abel into conflict with outlaw Hard Case Williams and his gang.

Cast
 Tab Hunter as Abel Wood
 Divine as Rosie Velez
 Lainie Kazan as Marguerita Ventura
 Cesar Romero as Father Garcia
 Geoffrey Lewis as Hard Case Williams
 Henry Silva as Bernardo
 Courtney Gains as Richard "Red Dick" Barker
 Gina Gallego as Ninfa
 Nedra Volz as Ed "Big Ed"  
 Woody Strode as Blackman, Hard Case Gang
 Pedro Gonzalez Gonzalez as Mexican, Hard Case Gang

Production
The title was taken from the nickname given to King Vidor's 1946 film Duel in the Sun.

John Waters was asked to direct, but refused because he did not write the script.

Edith Massey was cast as Big Ed, but died shortly after her screen test. Bartel was uneasy about casting her because he thought it would look too much like a John Waters film without John Waters.

The role of Marguerita was originally set for Chita Rivera.

Principal photography took place in Santa Fe, New Mexico.

In the original script, Rosie was supposed to die but the filmmakers changed their mind during filming.

Critical reception
Variety said "Lust In The Dust is a saucy, irreverent, quite funny send-up of the Western. Film takes some of the old-time conventions – the silent stranger, the saloon singer with a past, the motley crew of crazed gunslingers, the missing stash of gold – and stands them on their head with outrageous comedy and imaginative casting."

Music
All songs composed by Karen Hart 
 "Tarnished Tumbleweed" – Mike Stull
 "These Lips Were Made for Kissin'" – Divine
 "South of My Border" – Lainie Kazan

References

External links
  
 

1985 films
1985 comedy films
1980s English-language films
1980s Western (genre) comedy films
1980s parody films
American Western (genre) comedy films
American independent films
American parody films
Films directed by Paul Bartel
New World Pictures films
1980s American films